The Waterloo Indians were a minor league baseball team that played from 1977 to 1988 in the Midwest League. They played their home games at Riverfront Stadium and were affiliated with the Cleveland Indians. They were located in Waterloo, Iowa.

Year-by-year record

References

Defunct Midwest League teams
Baseball teams established in 1977
Defunct baseball teams in Iowa
Cleveland Guardians minor league affiliates
1977 establishments in Iowa
1988 disestablishments in Iowa
Baseball teams disestablished in 1988
Eastern Iowa League teams